Jorge Perona García (born 1 April 1982 in Enguera, Valencian Community) is a Spanish former professional footballer who played as a forward.

Honours
Spain U16
UEFA European Under-16 Championship: 1999

References

External links

1982 births
Living people
People from Enguera
Spanish footballers
Footballers from the Valencian Community
Association football forwards
Segunda División players
Segunda División B players
Tercera División players
FC Barcelona C players
FC Barcelona Atlètic players
Hércules CF players
Lorca Deportiva CF footballers
Atlético Levante UD players
CD Alcoyano footballers
Real Oviedo players
CD Tenerife players
FC Cartagena footballers
Huracán Valencia CF players
CD Eldense footballers
FC Jumilla players
Spain youth international footballers